Little Brazil is a four-piece rock band formed in 2002 in Omaha, Nebraska by Landon Hedges of Desaparecidos and formerly of The Good Life. Originally he intended to use the name Little Brazil for his solo work, yet he recruited his friends Dan Maxwell on bass and Corey Broman on drums, who were in Secret Behind Sunday and Son, Ambulance. The last member was guitarist Austin Britton, who Landon met at an open mic night.

Greg Edds was later added to guitar duties and Oliver Morgan on drums from 2004-2013. Matt Bowen played drums from 2014-2016.

In 2014, Mike Friedman took over lead guitar along with drummer Nate Van Fleet joining in 2016.

In 2017, Shawn Cox joined on lead guitar.

Little Brazil has played alongside bands such as The Good Life, Cursive, Make Believe, The Meat Puppets, Nada Surf, The Thermals, and Tegan and Sara.

Band members
Landon Hedges
Danny Maxwell
Shawn Cox
Nate Van Fleet

Former members
Mike Friedman
Matt Bowen (musician)
Greg Edds
Oliver Morgan
Austin Britton
Corey Broman

Discography
Little Brazil EP (2004 · Mt. Fuji Records)
You and Me (2005 · Mt. Fuji Records)
Tighten the Noose (2007 · Mt. Fuji Records)
Son (2009 · Anodyne Records)
Send the Wolves (2018 · Max Trax Records)
Just Leave (2022 ·  Max Trax Records)

See also
Desaparecidos
The Good Life
Son, Ambulance

External links
Little Brazil on Facebook
Little Brazil on MySpace
Mt. Fuji Records
Lazy-i Interview: July 2014
Lazy-i Interview: January 2004
Lazy-i Interview: February 2003 with Landon Hedges

Indie rock musical groups from Nebraska
Musical groups from Omaha, Nebraska
Musical groups established in 2002
2002 establishments in Nebraska